Evin Prison is a prison located in the Evin neighborhood of Tehran, Iran. The prison has been the primary site for the housing of Iran's political prisoners since 1972, before and after the Islamic Revolution, in a purpose-built wing nicknamed "Evin University" due to the number of students and intellectuals housed there. Evin Prison has been accused of committing "serious human rights abuses" against its political dissidents and critics of the government.

History
Evin Prison was constructed in 1972 under the reign of Mohammad Reza Pahlavi. It is located at the foot of the Alborz mountains on the former home of Ziaeddin Tabatabaee, who briefly served as prime minister in the 1920s. Iran's judicial system is based on Islamic law, or sharia. The system is supervised by the Minister of Justice and the chief public prosecutor, appointed by the Supreme Leader.

The prison grounds include an execution yard, a courtroom, and separate blocks for common criminals and female inmates. It was originally operated by the Shah's security and intelligence service, SAVAK. It was initially designed to house 320 inmates — 20 in solitary cells and 300 in two large communal blocks — and was expanded to hold more than 1,500 prisoners, including 100 solitary cells for political prisoners, by 1977. On February 11, 1979, during the Iranian Revolution, crowds of rebels stormed the prison and freed all the inmates.

Under the Islamic Republic of Iran, the prison population was again expanded to 15,000 inmates. According to scholar Ervand Abrahamian: "In theory, Evin was a detention center for those awaiting trial", after which the prisoners would be transferred to another prison, either Qezel Hesar or Gohardasht Prison. "In reality, Evin served as a regular prison as many waited years before being brought to trial". Prominent prisoners often served their entire sentences in Evin. Executions took place at Evin. Following the Islamic Revolution, Mohammad Kachouyi was made warden of Evin. After his assassination in June 1981, Asadollah Lajevardi, the chief prosecutor of Tehran, served as warden until 1985. In 1998, the People's Mujahedin of Iran assassinated Lajevardi. The prison is located in a residential and commercial area known as Evin, next to the Saadat Abad district. A large park area with a popular upscale teahouse and restaurant is immediately next to it. Photography in front of and around the prison is illegal. Prisoners from Evin and Ghezel Hesar prison are to be transferred eventually to the Central Prison of Tehran, also known as Fashafaviye or Fashafoyeh5.

2022 fire

On 15 October 2022, amidst the Mahsa Amini protests, a severe fire started in this prison, and the sound of security forces shooting was heard from inside the prison during numerous clashes with prisoners. The Center for Human Rights in Iran confirmed that it had received reports that there was a "gun battle" in Evin prison Saturday night that was continuing at 22:00 local time. Videos shared on social media on Saturday showed smoke rising from the prison. Repeated gunfire, as well as anti-government chants, could also be heard in the videos. The media affiliated to the Islamic Revolutionary Guard Corps and the government of the Islamic Republic reported the conflict and fire in this prison. According to the Judiciary Media Center, during a fight between several prisoners in Ward 6 and Ward 7, both of which are special prisons for financial convictions and theft, the sewing workshop of the prison caught fire. The families of prisoners in Evin and various others gathered near the prison. Government forces threw tear gas at them in response. The security forces also blocked Yadegar-e-Emam Expressway to prevent people from approaching. Anti-government slogans can be heard in videos taken around the prison.

Prisoners

1970s and 1980s

Notable prisoners at Evin before the 1979 revolution include Ayatollah Mahmoud Taleghani and Grand Ayatollah Hossein-Ali Montazeri. A prisoner held after the Islamic revolution was Marina Nemat, spent two years in Evin from 1982, she participated in anti-regime protests at her school. She has written about her torture and the death of her fellow students at the prison. In her 2013 memoir, Face to Face with the Beast: Iranian Women in Mullahs' Prisons, the former Iranian nurse, Hengameh Haj Hassan, wrote about her incarceration in Evin prison in 1981, after being arrested for suspected connections with the  Mojahedin. She described a system in which women inmates were frequently and systematically tortured by members of Iran's Islamic Revolutionary Guard, mostly by being beaten on the soles of their feet with cables. She also describes mass executions:"In Unit 209, every day about 6.00pm, at dinner time, we heard an enormous and deafening noise, like a lorry shedding a heavy load of metal... It was the discharge of tens of firearms being fired at once on our friends."

2000s

Political prisoners of note held at Evin have included Akbar Ganji (held there from 2000 to 2006), Mohsen Sazegara (in 2003), Nasser Zarafshan, as well as Hamid Pourmand (2005–06), Dariush Zahedi, a professor at the University of California, Berkeley, on charges of espionage (2003), subsequently acquitted in 2004, and Ramin Jahanbegloo (2006).

On 23 June 2003, Iranian-Canadian photojournalist Zahra Kazemi was arrested for taking photographs in front of the prison and died of blunt trauma to the head while imprisoned. The Iranian government said that she died from a stroke while being interrogated. Doctors examining Kazemi's body found evidence of rape, torture, and a skull fracture.

At dawn on 27 July 2008, the Iranian government executed a total of 29 people at Evin Prison by hanging.

Iranian music producer and composer, Hangi Tavakoli was held in a solitary cell in Section 209 from December 2008 to February 2009 for the crime of "Action Against National Security" because of some of the music he had written and produced, which Iranian Government had labeled them as "Brainwashing Against the Government". He had a sentence of execution, death by hanging, but due to the raising of human rights campaigns initiated by members of the public, the Iranian Justice System was pushed to reduce the sentence to 3 months of jail time and a US$100,000 penalty, conditioned on a full stop on all his musical activities. Tavakoli became a renowned record producer who continues his work outside of Iran.

Esha Momeni, a student at the California State University, Northridge, was held at Evin after her arrest on 15 October 2008 for crimes against national security. She was in Iran to visit family and research women's rights in the country. Momeni was released 11 November 2008.

On 17 November 2008, Ali Ashtari, a computer wholesaler who provided intelligence about Iran's nuclear facilities to Mossad, the Israeli intelligence agency, was executed by hanging at Evin Prison after being convicted in June 2008.  Later that same month, journalist/blogger Hossein Derakhshan was held at Evin after his arrest in November 2008, allegedly for spying for Israel. Derakhshan was sentenced to 19½ years in prison on 28 September 2010.

Roxana Saberi, an Iranian-American journalist, was arrested in January 2009 for reporting without press credentials, with a charge of espionage added in April. She was held in the Evin Prison until her release in May 2009.

French student Clotilde Reiss stood trial in August 2009.

Over the years, Iranian converts to Christianity have also been detained. On 5 March 2009, Marzieh Amirizadeh Esmaeilabad and Maryam Rustampoor were arrested by Iranian security forces and labeled "anti-government activists". The women were held at Evin Prison. On 18 November 2009, they were released without bail, but the charges remained intact. In May 2010, Maryam and Marzieh were cleared of all charges.

Three Belgian tourists, Vincent Boon-Falleur, Idesbald Van den Bosch, and Diego Mathieu, were detained in Evin Prison for three months in 2009. Van den Bosch and Boon-Falleur were arrested on 5 September 2009 for entering an unmarked Iranian Military Zone near Semnan. They were detained in Semnan for three days before being transferred to Evin. Mathieu was later (16 September) arrested at the Iran-Turkmenistan border because the three had met on 4 September and exchanged phone numbers. The three were accused of spying and detained for three months (8 September—8 December 2009) in Section 209 of Evin, initially in solitary confinement and then in four-person cells with other Iranians. They were released thanks to Belgian diplomatic negotiations.

Iranian-Canadian journalist Maziar Bahari was imprisoned in Evin for 118 days after being in Iran while there on assignment to cover the 2009 Iran presidential election. Bahari documented his time at Evin in his memoir, titled Then They Came for Me: A Family's Story of Love, Captivity, and Survival, which was published by Random House in 2011. The memoir is the basis of the film Rosewater, which was written and directed by former The Daily Show host Jon Stewart. The film's title references the nickname Bahari gave his interrogator/torturer at Evin, based on the man's cologne.

Three long-time Middle-Eastern residents, Shane Bauer, Joshua Fattal, and Sarah Shourd, who were on holiday in Iraqi Kurdistan and were detained by Iran, were held in Evin Prison since the beginning of August 2009. Shourd was kept in solitary confinement. The Washington Post reported that they "were arrested in July [2009] by Iranian border guards while hiking in the mountainous Kurdish region between Iraq and Iran. Their families say they crossed the border accidentally, but a top Iranian prosecutor last month accused the three of spying." In December 2009, Iran's foreign minister Manouchehr Mottaki said the three would be put on trial, in a move that coincided with other points of contention between the two countries. Sarah Shourd was freed 14 September 2010, on a  bail. Two days earlier, the three Americans had been charged with espionage by Iranian prosecutors.

Iranian-American television and music producer and owner of Tapesh Television based in Los Angeles, Masoud Jamali, was imprisoned in Evin in 2012 for one year, charged with propaganda against Iran, and forbidden to leave Iran for three years. He was held in Section 209 of the prison for five months and was in 350 prison for seven months. 

The prison also held members of religious minorities, including members of the Baháʼí Faith — on 14 May 2008, members of an informal body that oversaw the needs of the Baháʼí community in Iran were arrested and taken to Evin. They were held in Section 209 of the prison which is run by the government's Ministry of Intelligence. On 11 August 2010, it became known that the court sentence was 20 years imprisonment for each of the seven prisoners which was later reduced to ten years. After the sentence, they were transferred to Gohardasht Prison.

According to Roxana Saberi, the two Baháʼí women were confined in a small cell about four meters by five meters, with two little, metal-covered windows. They had no bed. "They must sleep on blankets", said Saberi. "They have no pillows, either. They roll up a blanket to use as a pillow. They use their chadors as a bed sheet."

Studying in India, Asghari was arrested in 2008 at Tehran Imam Khomeini International Airport and held in custody since. Vahid Asghari had sued Fars News (IRGC media) and IRIB (Islamic Republic of Iran Broadcasting) at the fourth branch of the Culture and Media Court due to the false accusation that was attributed to him when he was in the known 350 ward of Evin 2011.

2010s and 2020s

Abdolmalek Rigi, the leader of Jundullah, was executed in the prison in 2010.

From January to May 2010, student activist Majid Tavakoli was held in Evin, primarily in solitary confinement. He began a hunger strike to protest the conditions of his imprisonment and was transferred to Gohardasht Prison in August 2010.

Human rights blogger and U.S. National Press Club honoree Kouhyar Goudarzi served a one-year prison term in Evin in 2010 for "spreading propaganda against the regime". On 31 July 2011, he was rearrested, and though his current whereabouts are unconfirmed, he is believed to be held in solitary confinement in Evin.

Iranian laser physicist Omid Kokabee, who at the time of arrest was a student of University of Texas at Austin, was imprisoned at Evin in February 2011 and sentenced to 10 years of imprisonment on charges of collaboration with an enemy.

Majid Jamali Fashi, convicted of assassinating Iranian scientist Masoud Alimohammadi and a suspected Mossad spy, was hanged on 15 May 2012 after being convicted on 28 August 2011.

Nasser Fahimi,(born on May 8, 1974, in  Kurdistan, a doctor and human rights activist, was arrested by the Ministry of Information on July 20, 2009, and was sentenced to 15 years in prison by the 15th Branch of Tehran Revolutionary Court, headed by Judge Abolqasem Salavati, on the charges of acting against the country's security, disturbing public opinion, insulting the leadership, and threatening the judicial authorities. Dr. Nasser Fahimi is the first figure in the political history of Iran who formally requested the Islamic Republic to revoke his Iranian citizenship
due to the type of government (dictatorship).

Saeed Abedini, an Iranian-American pastor, was sentenced on 27 January 2013 to 8 years imprisonment on charges of evangelizing for his Christian faith. The Obama administration secured his release in a prisoner swap in January 2016.

Mohammad Heidari and Kourosh Ahmadi, accused of spying for CIA and Mossad, were executed in the prison on 19 May 2013 after being sentenced to death by Tehran's Revolutionary Court for various counts of espionage.

Marzieh Rasouli, a journalist who writes about culture and the arts for several of Iran's reformist and independent publications, was arrested in 2012 and accused of collaborating with the BBC. In 2014 she was convicted of "spreading propaganda" and "disturbing the public order". Sentenced to two years in prison and 50 lashes, she was sent to Evin Prison on 8 July 2014. PEN International has called for her "immediate and unconditional" release.

Amir Hekmati, veteran US Marine and an American citizen of Iranian origin, was arrested on charges of espionage in August 2011 and sentenced to execution. Amir was released by Iran as part of the 16 January 2016 prisoner swap with the United States.

On 5 October 2013, Hossein Rajabian Iranian filmmaker and Mehdi Rajabian, a musician, were arrested by the Iranian security forces. They were held for two months in Section 2A (solitary confinement) of the Evin prison. Finally, on 22 December 2015, at Branch 28 court of the Tehran, they were sentenced to six years in prison for "insulting the sacred" and "propaganda against the state" through artistic activity, as well as a 200 million Toman (about ) fine.

Maryam Shafipour, an Iranian human rights activist, spent seven months of pre-trial detention in Evin Prison, including more than two months in solitary confinement. Shafipour was sentenced in March 2014 to seven years in prison for her political activities. Human rights organizations have called for her release and condemned her conviction and prison sentence. She was released in July 2015.

Seyed Hamed Hooriaband worked at the Iranian Embassy in Paris, France. Having taken the side of the people in joining protests for the Green Movement and the opposition in Paris at the 2009 presidential elections, he was fired, targeted, harassed, and made an example of by the Islamic Regime so none of the other diplomatic government officials' family members would dare to oppose from within the system publicly. After having his family threatened by the Ministry of Intelligence and Security, he returned to Iran. In October 2011, security agents raided his parents’ home and arrested him without a charge. He was put in solitary confinement at the Evin Prison in the infamous section 240, reserved for political prisoners, where he endured psychological torture and then charged with espionage and embezzlement. Revolutionary Court judge Salavati then sentenced him without due process of the law and access to a lawyer. He was sentenced to two years in prison for espionage and one year and ten months for embezzlement. The court then acquitted him of embezzlement charges, but even though the sentence was revoked, he was unlawfully kept for another 13 months in prison and was fined in cash. He has recently been released on bail for good conduct.

From February to April 2018, Sufis activist Kasra Nouri during the 2018 Dervish protests was held in Evin, primarily in solitary confinement. He was later transferred to Fashafoyeh Prison, but was sent back to Evin in January 2021.

Australian academic Kylie Moore-Gilbert was a prisoner here before being moved to Qarchak Prison in August 2020, although she was later moved back to Evin. She was released in November 2020.

In 2022, during the 2021–2022 Iranian protests, a riot police unit cracked down on prisoners, and a deadly fire killed at least eight people. 

Farideh Moradkhani was arrested and taken to Evin prison. She is a niece and a critic of Khomeini.

Allegations of rape and torture
In August 2009, President Mahmoud Ahmadinejad said in a live broadcast on state radio on rape and torture in Iranian prisons, "In some detention centers, inappropriate measures have taken place for which the enemy was again responsible."

Following the 2009 Iranian presidential election and subsequent protests, Iranian presidential candidate Mehdi Karroubi said several protesters held behind bars had been savagely raped, according to a confidential letter to senior cleric and former President Akbar Hashemi Rafsanjani. Karroubi said this was a "fragment" of the evidence he had and that if the denials did not stop, he would release even more.

It is said that interrogators have used rape in Iran for decades. During the 1980s, the rape of female political prisoners was so prevalent that it prompted Hussein-Ali Montazeri, Supreme Leader Ayatollah Khomeini’s then-deputy, to write the following to Khomeini in a letter dated 7 October 1986: "Did you know that young women are raped in some of the prisons of the Islamic Republic?" Two prominent members of Iran's human rights community, the feminist lawyer and journalist Shadi Sadr and the blogger and activist Mojtaba Saminejad published essays online from inside Iran saying prison rape has a long history in the Islamic Republic.

In August 2021, a "hacktivist" group, going by the name "Edaalate Ali", leaked a CCTV footage showing the mistreatment of inmates, including a merciless Muslim cleric walking over the body of an elderly man, who was dragged across the institution by prison guards.

See also

References and notes

Bibliography

External links
Inside Iran's most notorious jail, BBC News report on a visit to the prison given by a group of domestic and foreign journalists.
Evin Prison on Google Maps
Photograph of Evin prison

Buildings and structures in Tehran
Human rights abuses in Iran
Prisons in Iran
Iranian entities subject to the U.S. Department of the Treasury sanctions
Specially Designated Nationals and Blocked Persons List